Jari Tervo (born 2 February 1959) is a Finnish author. He is a major name in current Finnish literature.

He writes traditional plot-driven prose, ranging from humorous (Poliisin poika) to a detective story (Myyrä). His works often include autobiographical elements; for example, Kallellaan is a diary, and Minun sukuni tarina has a protagonist who is the author himself, all but in name.
Despite his renown in Finland, only one of his novels have been translated into English: Among the Saints (Pyhiesi Yhteyteen) in 2014.

He was also one of the team captains on Finnish TV's version of Have I Got News For You, Uutisvuoto, from the beginning of the show in 1998 until 2017.

Bibliography

Novels
 The Court of the North (Pohjan hovi, 1992)
 Policeman's Son (Poliisin poika, 1993)
 Among the Saints (Pyhiesi yhteyteen, 1995) - published in English in 2014.
 Windswept Expanse (Tuulikaappimaa, 1997)
 My Family Chronicle (Minun sukuni tarina, 1999)
 Kallellaan (2000)
 Suomemme heimo (2001)
 Rautapää (2002)
 The Mole (Myyrä, 2004)
 Ohrana (2006)
 Troikka (2008)
 Koljatti (2009)
 Layla (2011)

References
 Introduction

External links 

1959 births
Living people
People from Rovaniemi
Finnish writers
Writers from Lapland (Finland)
Finnish television personalities